Jan Bastiaans (May 27, 1917 in Rotterdam - October 31, 1997 in Warmond) was a Dutch neurologist and psychiatrist, known for his controversial Bastiaans method of treatment of traumatised survivors of The Holocaust suffering from survivor guilt with LSD.

References

1917 births
1997 deaths
Dutch neurologists
Dutch psychiatrists